Lastovo is an island in Croatia, but may also refer to:

 Lastovo (town), the eponymous town and municipality
 MF Lastovo (built 1969), a ferry owned and operated by Croatian shipping company Jadrolinija